High Field railway station was a station on the Selby to Driffield Line in the East Riding of Yorkshire, England serving the east end of the village of Bubwith. It opened as Bubwith High Field in 1859 and was renamed High Field on 1 December 1873. It closed on 20 September 1954.

References

External links
 High Field station on navigable 1947 O. S. map
 

Disused railway stations in the East Riding of Yorkshire
Former North Eastern Railway (UK) stations
Railway stations in Great Britain opened in 1859
Railway stations in Great Britain closed in 1954